Fin (stylized as ƒIN) is the debut studio album by Spanish electronic music producer John Talabot, released on 14 February 2012.

Critical reception 

Upon its release, Fin received acclaim from music critics. At Metacritic, which assigns a normalized rating out of 100, the album has an average score of 80 out of 100, based on 20 reviews. Pitchfork awarded the album its "Best New Music" title. Fin was named the best album of 2012 on XLR8Rs year-end list and placed third on year-end lists by Mixmag and Resident Advisor.

Track listing

References

2012 debut albums